The Site of Ferdinand Branstetter Post No. 1 of the American Legion is a vacant lot in Van Tassell, Wyoming where one of the first American Legion posts in the United States was established in 1919. The post was named after Ferdinand Branstetter, a Van Tassell resident who died in World War I. The structure housing the post has since been demolished.  The site was listed on the National Register of Historic Places in 1969.  In 1969, it was hoped that an interpretative sign would be put up, and also possibly that a restored post building would be constructed.

An interpretative sign exists at the site, in 2009.

References

External links
Ferdinand Branstetter Post No. 1, American Legion at the Wyoming State Historic Preservation Office

American Legion buildings
Clubhouses on the National Register of Historic Places in Wyoming
Geography of Niobrara County, Wyoming
National Register of Historic Places in Niobrara County, Wyoming
Buildings and structures completed in 1919
1919 establishments in Wyoming